Van B. Poole (born July 5, 1935) is a former Republican politician from Florida.

Born in Jackson, the seat of Madison County in western Tennessee, he graduated in 1958 from Memphis State University in Memphis, Tennessee. He relocated to Florida in 1963.

From 1953 to 1961, Poole served in the United States Army Reserve. From 1971 to 1979, he was a member of the Florida House of Representatives from Broward County in south Florida. He was elected to the state House in the same election in which his fellow Republicans, Governor Claude R. Kirk, Jr., and U.S. Representative William C. Cramer of St. Petersburg, lost. For two years, he was the House Minority Whip. From 1979 to 1983, he was a member of the Florida Senate. In 1982, he received 38.3 percent of the general election vote in his challenge to Democratic U.S. Senator Lawton Chiles, who won his third and final term in the body. Chiles was first elected in 1970, when he defeated Cramer. Poole ran for Treasurer of Florida in 1986, but lost to Bill Gunter.

Under the Republican Governor Bob Martinez, Poole was the director of the Florida Department of Business Regulation. From 1989 to 1993, he  chaired the Florida Republican Party. In 2001, then Governor Jeb Bush appointed him to the Federal Judicial Nomination Commission, headed by former Governor Martinez.

Poole spent twenty years as an insurance executive with Krieg Kostas & Poole and is currently a lobbyist with Dutko Poole McKinley.

He resides in Fort Lauderdale in Broward County, Florida

References

External links

|-

|-

|-

|-

 

|-

1935 births
Living people
People from Jackson, Tennessee
University of Memphis alumni
Republican Party members of the Florida House of Representatives
Republican Party Florida state senators
Politicians from Fort Lauderdale, Florida
American businesspeople
American lobbyists